Aloysius is Lord Sebastian Flyte's teddy bear in Evelyn Waugh's novel Brideshead Revisited, published in 1945.

Aloysius is with Sebastian as he gets a "haircut" the first time the novel's protagonist, Charles Ryder, sees Sebastian at Oxford University. Later in the novel, Sebastian wonders whether he should take Aloysius to Venice with him: "I have a good mind not to take Aloysius to Venice. I don't want him to meet a lot of horrid Italian bears and pick up bad habits" (Chapter 3). Sebastian describes his time spent at Brideshead with Charles in Chapter 4: "If it could only be like this always – always summer, always alone, the fruit always ripe, and Aloysius in a good temper...". 

The model for Aloysius was Archibald Ormsby-Gore, the beloved teddy bear of John Betjeman, Waugh's friend at Oxford. The bear is most likely named after the Catholic saint Aloysius Gonzaga – the patron saint of youth.

Aloysius, and in particular his representation in the 1981 television adaptation of the novel, is credited with having triggered the late-20th century teddy bear renaissance. He was depicted by a teddy bear named Delicatessen, owned by the actor Peter Bull.

References

Further reading
 "Brideshead bear is signed, sealed and delivered back from auction" Oxford Mail. 23 July 2013
 "Aloysius too ancient to revisit Brideshead" Reuters. 5 June 2007

Teddy bears
Evelyn Waugh characters